Martyna Synoradzka (born 30 January 1988 in Poznań) is a Polish female fencer. At the 2012 Summer Olympics she competed in Women's foil. She was defeated 8-15 by Russia's Kamilla Gafurzianova in the table of 32.  She was part of the Polish women's foil team that finished in 5th place.

She began fencing at the age of 11, following in the footsteps of her brother.

References

External links
  pkol.pl 
 Profile at the European Fencing Confederation

Polish female fencers
Polish foil fencers
1988 births
Living people
Olympic fencers of Poland
Fencers at the 2012 Summer Olympics
Sportspeople from Poznań
Universiade medalists in fencing
Universiade bronze medalists for Poland
Medalists at the 2013 Summer Universiade
21st-century Polish women
20th-century Polish women